Maksym Lutsenko (born January 30, 1993) is a Ukrainian professional basketball player, who plays for Kyiv-Basket of the Ukrainian Basketball SuperLeague.

He is able to play as a small forward and a point guard.

External links
 Maksym Lutsenko at basketball.eurobasket.com 
 Maksym Lutsenko

BC Budivelnyk players
Ukrainian men's basketball players
1993 births
Living people
BC Kyiv players
BC Azovmash players
Small forwards